Jayashree Kabir (born  1952) is a Bengali film actress. She acted in around 30 films in West Bengal and Bangladesh.

Career
While studying in South Point School Jayashree Roy earned Miss Kolkata title in 1968. She got her first break from Satyajit Ray through the film Pratidwandi in 1969. She married Bangladeshi film director Alamgir Kabir and starred in two of his films, Simana Periye and Rupali Soikote, which are regarded by the British Film Institute (BFI) as among the finest films to have come out of Bangladesh. Later in life, she moved to London where she now resides. She teaches English at a higher education college.

Films
 Pratidwandi (1970)
Rodonbhora bosonto (1974)
 Shurjokonna (1975)
 Simana Periye (1977)
 Sabyasachi (1977)
 Rupali Soikote (1979)
 Ashadharan (1982)
 Puroshkar''  (1983)

Personal life
Jayashree Roy has a son, Lenin Saurav Kabir, with her husband Alamgir Kabir.

References

External links
 

1952 births
Living people
Bengali actresses
Bangladeshi emigrants to England
Bangladeshi film actresses
Actresses from Kolkata
Best Supporting Actress Bachsas Award winners